Juno Ridge is a census-designated place (CDP) in Palm Beach County, Florida, United States. The population was 742 at the 2000 census.

Geography
Juno Ridge is located at  (26.849038, -80.062152).

According to the United States Census Bureau, the CDP has a total area of 0.4 km2 (0.2 mi2), all land.

Demographics

As of the census of 2000, there were 742 people, 395 households, and 169 families living in the CDP.  The population density was 1,909.9/km2 (5,100.7/mi2).  There were 429 housing units at an average density of 1,104.3/km2 (2,949.1/mi2). The racial makeup of the CDP was 93.26% White (88.7% were Non-Hispanic White,) 1.89% African American, 0.13% Native American, 0.81% Asian, 0.54% Pacific Islander, 1.75% from other races, and 1.62% from two or more races. Hispanic or Latino of any race were 5.66% of the population.

There were 395 households, out of which 22.3% had children under the age of 18 living with them, 23.5% were married couples living together, 13.7% had a female householder with no husband present, and 57.0% were non-families. 43.8% of all households were made up of individuals, and 6.3% had someone living alone who was 65 years of age or older.  The average household size was 1.88 and the average family size was 2.60.

In the CDP, the population was spread out, with 18.1% under the age of 18, 10.0% from 18 to 24, 44.2% from 25 to 44, 20.2% from 45 to 64, and 7.5% who were 65 years of age or older.  The median age was 35 years. For every 100 females, there were 116.3 males.  For every 100 females age 18 and over, there were 120.3 males.

The median income for a household in the CDP was $37,727, and the median income for a family was $50,000. Males had a median income of $29,917 versus $27,065 for females. The per capita income for the CDP was $20,270.  About 1.8% of families and 9.4% of the population were below the poverty line, including 6.4% of those under age 18 and 15.7% of those age 65 or over.

As of 2000, English was the first language for 92.50% of all residents, while Spanish was the mother tongue for 7.49% of the population.

References

Census-designated places in Palm Beach County, Florida
Census-designated places in Florida